Arnold Javier Cruz Argueta (born 22 December 1970 in El Progreso) is a retired Honduran football defender. He currently is manager of second division side UPNFM.

Club career
Nicknamed Chele, Cruz started his professional career at Olimpia before moving abroad to join compatriot César Obando at Mexican outfit UA Tamaulipas. He then played for fellow Mexicans Toluca and Morelia and joined Major League Soccer in 1997, where he would turn out for D.C. United and San Jose Clash. The much-travelled defender enjoyed a season in Argentinian football with Chacarita Juniors in between two more spells with Olimpia and played for Costa Rican side Cartaginés and the Salvadorans of Águila.

He finally returned to Honduras and Olimpia in 2005 and finished his career at Platense in Liga Nacional de Honduras.

International career
Cruz made his debut for Honduras in a May 1991 UNCAF Nations Cup match against Panama and has earned a total of 50 caps, scoring 3 goals. He has represented his country in 18 FIFA World Cup qualification matches and played at the 1991, 1993, 1995 and 2003 UNCAF Nations Cups as well as at the 1991, 1996 and 1998 CONCACAF Gold Cups.

His final international was a June 2003 friendly match against Venezuela.

International goals
Scores and results list Honduras' goal tally first.

Retirement
He retired in 2008 and became assistant coach for Nahúm Espinoza at Platense. In 2011, he worked for a Youth Institution of the Honduran government. He became manager of UPNFM for the 2013 Clausura.

Honours and awards

Club
C.D. Olimpia
Liga Profesional de Honduras (1): 1992–93

Country
Honduras
Copa Centroamericana (2): 1993, 1995

References

External links
 

1971 births
Living people
People from Yoro Department
Association football defenders
Honduran footballers
Honduras international footballers
1991 CONCACAF Gold Cup players
1996 CONCACAF Gold Cup players
1998 CONCACAF Gold Cup players
2003 UNCAF Nations Cup players
C.D. Olimpia players
Correcaminos UAT footballers
Deportivo Toluca F.C. players
Atlético Morelia players
D.C. United players
San Jose Earthquakes players
Platense F.C. players
Chacarita Juniors footballers
C.S. Cartaginés players
C.D. Águila footballers
Honduran expatriate footballers
Expatriate footballers in Mexico
Expatriate soccer players in the United States
Expatriate footballers in Argentina
Expatriate footballers in Costa Rica
Expatriate footballers in El Salvador
Liga Nacional de Fútbol Profesional de Honduras players
Liga MX players
Major League Soccer players
Honduran football managers